The Cry of Love is a posthumous album by American rock singer-songwriter and guitarist Jimi Hendrix. Recorded primarily in 1970, it features new material that Hendrix was working on for his planned fourth studio album before his death later that year. While most of the songs were included on proposed track listings by Hendrix, the final selection was made by recording engineer Eddie Kramer and drummer Mitch Mitchell, with input from manager Michael Jeffery.  Hendrix, Kramer, and Mitchell are credited as the album's producers, with Jeffery as the executive producer.

Released on March 5, 1971, by Reprise Records in the United States and Track Records in the United Kingdom, The Cry of Love was successful on the record charts in both countries and was certified platinum by the Recording Industry Association of America (RIAA) in 1998. Critics responded favorably to the album, viewing it as an impressive tribute to Hendrix. Several of its songs were later featured on other efforts to recreate the album Hendrix had been working on, including Voodoo Soup in 1995 and First Rays of the New Rising Sun in 1997.

Recording and production 
The Cry of Love featured songs Hendrix had been working on at the time of his death and was the first attempt at presenting his planned first studio recording since the breakup of the Jimi Hendrix Experience. The Cry of Love is composed mostly of songs which Hendrix recorded in 1970 at his new Electric Lady Studios in New York City with drummer Mitch Mitchell and bassist Billy Cox.

About half of the album's ten songs were nearly completed with mixes prepared by Hendrix.  The balance were in varying stages of development and were mixed (and some overdubbed with new parts) after his death.  Two songs originally planned for The Cry of Love, "Dolly Dagger" and "Room Full of Mirrors", were instead held for the next planned Hendrix release, Rainbow Bridge; they were replaced by "Straight Ahead" and "My Friend".

The album credits Hendrix as a producer, as well as long-time recording engineer Eddie Kramer and Mitchell, who prepared the final mixes and track selection, with input from manager Michael Jeffery.

Seven of the songs on The Cry of Love were later included on Voodoo Soup, the 1995 attempt by producer Alan Douglas to present Hendrix's planned album. In 1997, all were included on First Rays of the New Rising Sun, along with seven other songs, in Kramer's most realized effort to complete Hendrix's last studio album.

Album format 
According to music journalist Peter Doggett, the album was "accepted for years as an authentic Hendrix album rather than a posthumous compilation." Doggett himself described The Cry of Love as "Kramer's concoction", while other music writers have identified it as being authorized or sanctioned by Hendrix himself.  Music historian Martin Huxley, The Guardians Jeremy Allen, and rock music journalist Eduardo Rivadavia call it a compilation album; music writers Phil Hardy, Frank N. Magill, and Richard Kienzle identify it as a "authorized", "true", or "formal" studio album.  Guitar World journalist Alan di Perna describes it as a "half-finished studio album".

In Ritchie Unterberger's opinion: "although many songs had been laid down in a state of near-completion, there's no telling what Jimi might have added, erased, or otherwise changed, especially bearing in mind his perfectionist nature ... The biggest compromise, however, was the decision to make the record a single disc, rather than the double LP that Hendrix had envisioned. ...  For these reasons, [The Cry of Love] can't be considered to be the fourth studio album Hendrix would have released had he survived, whether it would have ended up being called First Rays of the Rising Sun or something else."

However, Billy Cox said: "we [Hendrix and I] discussed the possibility of doing a single or double LP, but it really didn't make that much of a difference. You must remember even though they [record label and management] gave him a lot of freedom in the studio, when the record deal itself came about, he did not have the last say-so."

Release and reception

The Cry of Love was released on March 5, 1971. The album entered Billboard's Top LP's chart in the US at number 17 on March 6 and eventually reached number three. By April, it had sold 500,000 copies, and, in 1998, the Recording Industry Association of America (RIAA) certified the album platinum, which indicated sales of one million copies.  In the UK, it entered the UK Albums Chart on April 3, where it peaked at number two.

Reviewing for Rolling Stone in 1971, Lenny Kaye hailed The Cry of Love as the authentic posthumous Hendrix album, his last work, and "a beautiful, poignant testimonial, a fitting coda to the career of a man who was clearly the finest electric guitarist to be produced by the Sixties, bar none". That same year, Robert Christgau wrote in The Village Voice that the album is an "excellent testament" and may be Hendrix's best record behind Electric Ladyland (1968) because of its quality as a whole rather than its individual songs. Years later, he said the album as whole is free-flowing, devoid of affectations, and "warmer than the three Experience LPs", while writing in Christgau's Record Guide: Rock Albums of the Seventies (1981):

In the Encyclopedia of Popular Music (2006), Colin Larkin called The Cry of Love a "fitting tribute" to Hendrix, and Paul Evans wrote in The Rolling Stone Album Guide (1992) that it "showed the master, playing with Cox and Mitchell, at his most confident: 'Ezy Rider' and 'Angel' are the tough and tender faces of the genius at his most appealing." In 2014, VH1 deemed The Cry of Love "the greatest posthumous classic rock record of all time". That same year, it was reissued in both CD and LP formats by Experience Hendrix. Reviewing the reissue for Classic Rock magazine, Hugh Fielder acknowledged the "glories" of the original album's songs but questioned its value given their inclusion on 1997's First Rays of the New Rising Sun. However, Dan Bigna from The Sydney Morning Herald said in his review that, although all of the songs had been compiled on the more comprehensive First Rays collection, "there is something satisfying about having this first posthumous Hendrix release as a distinct object that illuminates the brush strokes of a genius".

Track listing

Personnel
From the original Reprise LP liner notes (supplemented with details from the First Rays of the New Rising Sun CD booklet):

Band members
Jimi Hendrixlead vocals, guitar, backing vocals on "In from the Storm", piano on "Freedom", production, mixing on "Freedom", "Nightbird Flying", "Ezy Ryder", "Astro Man", "Belly Button Window"
Billy Coxbass guitar on all tracks (except "My Friend", "Belly Button Window")
Mitch Mitchelldrums on all tracks (except "Ezy Ryder", "My Friend", "Belly Button Window"), posthumous production, mixing on "Angel"

Additional musicians
Juma Sultanpercussion on "Freedom", "Astro Man"
The Ghetto Fighters  Arthur and Albert Allenbacking vocals on "Freedom"
Buzzy Linhartvibraphone on "Drifting"
Buddy Milesdrums on "Ezy Ryder"
Billy Armstrongpercussion on "Ezy Ryder"
Steve Winwoodbacking vocals on "Ezy Ryder"
Chris Woodbacking vocals on "Ezy Ryder"
Noel Reddingbass guitar on "My Friend"
Kenny Pinetwelve-string guitar on "My Friend"
Jimmy Mayesdrums on "My Friend"
Stephen Stillspiano on "My Friend"
Paul Caruso  Gersharmonica on "My Friend"
Emeretta Marksbacking vocals on "In from the Storm"

Additional personnel
Michael Jefferyexecutive production
Eddie Kramerposthumous production, engineering on all tracks (except "Ezy Ryder", "My Friend"), mixing on all tracks
Jack Abramsengineering on "Ezy Ryder" (1969)
Bob Hughesengineering on "Ezy Ryder" (1970)
Nancy Reinercover art work
Victor Kahn-Sunshinephotography, graphic design

Charts

References

External links 
 The Cry of Love at Acclaimed Music (list of accolades)
 

1971 albums
Jimi Hendrix albums
Albums produced by Jimi Hendrix
Albums produced by Eddie Kramer
Albums recorded at Electric Lady Studios
Albums published posthumously
Reprise Records albums